Worranit Thawornwong (วรนิษฐ์ ถาวรวงศ์), better known as Mook is a Thai actress and singer. She is the most famous actress in GMMTV. She is best known for her role in the 2015 Thai television series Ugly Duckling Series: Perfect Match as Junior and in My Dear Loser as  Namkhing. She is also the Brand Ambassador of Idolo Thailand.

Early life and education
Worranit Thawornwong was born on 9 October 1996 in Bangkok, Thailand. She is the second child in the family. Her brother, Jirakit Thawornwong, is also an actor. She attended high school at Satriwitthaya 2 School and graduated from the Faculty of Humanities at Kasetsart University.

Career
Worranit started her acting career in 2014 through Channel Bang for the drama Rukjing Pinker as Bew. Later, she starred in another drama, Room Alone 401–410, as Snow.

Rising Popularity 
In 2015, she gained popularity through the drama Ugly Duckling: Perfect Match, where she was paired with Puttichai Kasetsin. She also sang the song for the said drama.

In 2016, she became part in another drama, Kiss The Series, where she was paired with Sattaphong Phiangphor. She was also paired with March Chutavuth Pattarakampol in another series, U-Prince where they took part in "Ambitious Boss".

In 2017, she participated in another series, My Dear Loser, paired up together with Thanat Loekhunnasombat. Their part was entitled Monster Romance.

In 2018, she was paired with Perawat Sangpotirat in another series, "Mint To Be". And she was paired with Yuke Songpaisan in another series, Love At First Hate.

In 2019, she was paired with Krissada Pornweroj in "Mia Noi" series. She was paired with Oil Thana Suttikamol in another series, "Plara Song Krueng".

In 2020, she participated in another series, Girl Next Room, paired up together with Pathompong Reonchaidee. Their part was entitled "Motorbike Baby". She was paired with Jirayu La-ongmanee in another series, "Ban Sao Sod".

Other than acting, she has also sung a few songs for the drama notably Mah Tun Welah Por Dee and Kon Jao Choo (Bee Dup Bee Doo) for Ugly Duckling: Perfect Match and Poot Wah Ruk Nai Jai for Roon Pee Secret Love. She also starred in "The Mask Singer Thailand". She has a very good sweet voice and sings ost songs.

Special Project 
In 2017, She also starred with Puttichai Kasetsin in GMMTV's special project "Little Big Dream" as a main role.

In 2020, She also starred in GMMTV's project "Love Stranger" (Ep 3) as a main role.

Filmography

Television series

Movie

Discography

Songs

Awards

References

External links

1996 births
Living people
Worranit Thawornwong
Worranit Thawornwong
Worranit Thawornwong
Worranit Thawornwong
Worranit Thawornwong
Thai television personalities
Worranit Thawornwong